Tiobe or TIOBE may refer to:

 The Importance of Being Earnest, a comic play by Oscar Wilde
 TIOBE index, a programming language popularity index